Elections to the Labour Party's Shadow Cabinet (more formally, its "Parliamentary Committee") occurred in November 1951. In addition to the 12 members elected, the Leader (Clement Attlee), Deputy Leader (Herbert Morrison), Labour Chief Whip (William Whiteley), and Labour Leader in the House of Lords (Christopher Addison) were automatically members.

Uniquely, in 1951, the voting tallies were not released, only the ranks of the successful candidates.

The results of the election are listed below:

References

1951
1951 elections in the United Kingdom